Mozaffarabad Rural District is in Baktash District of Miandoab County, West Azerbaijan province, Iran. Its constituent villages were, prior to its formation, in Zarrineh Rud Rural District until the latter was raised to the status of a district and divided into two rural districts and the city of Bagtash. The capital of the rural district is the village of Mozaffarabad, whose population at the 2016 National Census was 1,994 people in 588 households.

References 

Miandoab County

Rural Districts of West Azerbaijan Province

Populated places in West Azerbaijan Province

Populated places in Miandoab County

fa:دهستان مظفرآباد